Fidelis Ndyabagye (born February 24, 1950) is a Ugandan athlete.  He represented Uganda at the 1980 Olympics in the long jump.  He also competed at the 1978 All-Africa Games where he won the silver medal in the long jump and set the still current Ugandan national record at 7.75 meters.

After the Olympics he attended the University of New Mexico. He won the Western Athletic Conference 1982, 1984 and 1985 Indoor Championships and the 1985 Outdoor championships. By the time of his 1985 championship, he was 35 years old. How he managed to pass the strict NCAA eligibility requirements at that age is not explained. The Uganda Athletics Federation does not list the mark as a record, the WAC and University show the mark. The masters record would be surpassed a year later by Yugoslavian Nenad Stekić, who only a few years earlier had held the distinction of being the second best long jumper in history.

References

1950 births
Living people
Ugandan male long jumpers
Olympic athletes of Uganda
Athletes (track and field) at the 1980 Summer Olympics
African Games silver medalists for Uganda
African Games medalists in athletics (track and field)
Athletes (track and field) at the 1974 British Commonwealth Games
Commonwealth Games competitors for Uganda
Athletes (track and field) at the 1978 All-Africa Games
20th-century Ugandan people
21st-century Ugandan people